St Luke's Chapel, Brompton Hospital is a Grade II* listed Anglican church in Chelsea, London, England. The chapel was built in 1849, and the architect was E. B. Lamb. It forms part of the Royal Brompton Hospital.

References

Churches completed in 1849
19th-century Church of England church buildings
Church of England church buildings in the Royal Borough of Kensington and Chelsea
1849 establishments in the United Kingdom